The Armand Bayou Archeological District is a historical district located near Houston, Texas listed on the National Register of Historic Places. The district is part of the Armand Bayou Watershed which is located in southeast Harris County, encompassing portions of the cities of Houston, Pasadena, Deer Park, La Porte and Taylor Lake Village.

Humans first arrived in this bayou area seven to eight thousand years ago. These humans were nomadic Native Americans composed of the Karankawa, Attakapa, and Coahuiltecan peoples. Approximately twenty Middens (prehistoric waste sites) have been found along the Bayou.

References 

Historic districts on the National Register of Historic Places in Texas
Harris County, Texas